Cherry (born 24 September 1973) is a Burmese hurdler. She competed in the women's 400 metres hurdles at the 2000 Summer Olympics.

References

External links
 

1973 births
Living people
Athletes (track and field) at the 2000 Summer Olympics
Burmese female hurdlers
Olympic athletes of Myanmar
Southeast Asian Games medalists in athletics
Place of birth missing (living people)
Southeast Asian Games bronze medalists for Myanmar
Competitors at the 2001 Southeast Asian Games